Sherabad may refer to:

Regions 
 Sherabad (Bhawana), Pakistan
 Sherabad (Sindh), Pakistan

Others 
 Sherabad River, Tajikistan

See also 
 Sher (disambiguation)
 Shirabad (disambiguation)